Kara Antonio ( Donnellan, born 27 February 1992) is a former Australian rules footballer who played for the Fremantle Football Club in the AFL Women's competition.

Early life and amateur career
Antonio spent her early years in Victoria. She played state league football with the St Abans Women's Football Club (now VU Western Spurs) through 2012. Donnellan moved to Perth prior to the 2013 season and began playing with Swan Districts in the West Australian Women's Football League. She is currently the captain of Swan Districts.

In 2013, she was drafted by the Melbourne Football Club to play in the exhibition match representative side. She was selected fifth overall in the initial two-team draft.
She went on to play with the side in exhibition matches through 2016. Antonio was named best on ground following the first of two exhibition matches in 2015. She also played for and represented the  side in an exhibition match played in 2016.

AFL Women's career
In January 2017, she was announced as the inaugural captain of the Fremantle AFL Women's team.

Antonio was highlighted as "Player of the Week" by the AFL Players Association for her "best on ground" performance in the Dockers' first AFLW win in round 6 against . However, she tore a quadriceps in the third quarter of that match, causing her to miss the final game of the season. After six rounds, Antonio was statistically in the top two players overall and in score assists, fourth in kicks, tackles and clearances, and top ten in disposals and inside 50s.

Despite missing the final game, Antonio was nominated by her teammates for the AFL Players' Most Valuable Player Award, and was listed in the 2017 All-Australian team.

Fremantle signed Antonio for the 2018 season during the trade period in May 2017.

It was revealed Antonio signed on with the club for one year on 10 June 2021.

Statistics
Statistics are correct to the end of round 4, 2021.

|- style=background:#EAEAEA
| scope=row | 2017 ||  || 15
| 6 || 4 || 0 || 78 || 23 || 101 || 11 || 40 || 0.7 || 0.0 || 13.0 || 3.8 || 16.8 || 1.8 || 6.7 || 3
|-
| scope=row | 2018 ||  || 15
| 7 || 1 || 0 || 76 || 29 || 105 || 14 || 54 || 0.1 || 0.0 || 10.9 || 4.1 || 15.0 || 2.0 || 7.7 || 2
|- style=background:#EAEAEA
| scope=row | 2019 ||  || 15
| 8 || 0 || 3 || 58 || 17 || 75 || 7 || 24 || 0.0 || 0.4 || 8.3 || 2.4 || 10.7 || 1.0 || 3.4 || 5
|-
| scope=row | 2020 ||  || 15
| 7 || 1 || 0 || 56 || 24 || 80 || 25 || 36 || 0.1 || 0.0 || 8.0 || 3.4 || 11.4 || 3.6 || 5.1 || 1
|- style=background:#EAEAEA
| scope=row | 2021 ||  || 15
| 4 || 1 || 2 || 35 || 7 || 42 || 6 || 15 || 0.3 || 0.5 || 8.8 || 1.8 || 10.5 || 1.5 || 3.8 || 
|- class=sortbottom
! colspan=3 | Career
! 31 !! 7 !! 5 !! 303 !! 100 !! 403 !! 63 !! 169 !! 0.2 !! 0.2 !! 9.8 !! 3.2 !! 13.0 !! 2.0 !! 5.5 !! 11
|}

Personal life
In October 2019, Kara married fellow Fremantle player Ebony Antonio and changed her surname from Donnellan to Antonio.

References

External links

 
 

1992 births
Living people
Australian rules footballers from Victoria (Australia)
Australian rules footballers from Western Australia
Fremantle Football Club (AFLW) players
Fremantle Football Club captains
All-Australians (AFL Women's)
Lesbian sportswomen
Australian LGBT sportspeople
LGBT players of Australian rules football